Maximilian Paul Diarmuid Irons (born 17 October 1985) is an English-Irish actor. He is known for his roles in films such as Red Riding Hood (2011), The White Queen (2013), The Host (2013), Woman in Gold (2014), The Riot Club (2014), Bitter Harvest (2017), and The Wife (2018). He also starred in the spy thriller series Condor (2018–2020).

Early life
Maximilian Paul Diarmuid Irons was born in the Camden borough of London on 17 October 1985, the son of Irish actress Sinéad Cusack and English actor Jeremy Irons. He has an older brother, Samuel Irons, who is a photographer.  Their mother's family was deeply involved with theatre: they are the grandsons of actors Cyril Cusack and Maureen Cusack. Through his mother, Irons is a half-brother of politician Richard Boyd Barrett; his aunts are the actresses Niamh Cusack and Sorcha Cusack, and his uncle is theatre producer Pádraig Cusack. 

Irons attended the Dragon School in Oxford, and Bryanston School in Dorset, before finishing at the Guildhall School of Music and Drama, where he graduated in 2008. He was dyslexic and struggled in school, as the teaching methods did not suit his learning style. His father discouraged him from going into an acting career. While first starting off in acting, Irons worked as a barman.

Career

Acting
In 2011, Irons played Henry in Catherine Hardwicke's Red Riding Hood. He was chosen to play Jared Howe in the 2013 film adaptation of The Host, based on Stephenie Meyer's science fiction novel of the same name. 

In the 2013 television series The White Queen, Irons took the leading role of Edward IV of England. The series, based on Philippa Gregory's best-selling historical novel series The Cousins' War, was broadcast weekly on BBC One, ending on 18 August 2013. Irons appeared in The Riot Club (2014), the film adaptation of the play Posh. In 2016, he starred in the ITV miniseries Tutankhamun as archeologist Howard Carter. In April 2017, producers announced Irons had been cast to play Joe Turner, the role created by Robert Redford in Three Days of the Condor (1975), in a television series based on the movie. He also joined Lifetime's movie adaption of Flowers in the Attic. 

That year he starred in the film Crooked House (2017), based on a 1949 novel by Agatha Christie of the same name. Terence Stamp, Glenn Close, Gillian Anderson, and Stefanie Martini also are among the large cast in the film.

Modelling
Irons has modelled for companies including Burberry and Mango. As of 2012, he was on a modelling contract for Macy's I.N.C. collection for Fall/Winter 2012. In 2015, he was named one of GQs 50 best-dressed British men.

Personal life
In 2013, Irons began dating Tatler fashion director Sophie Pera. They were married in Oxfordshire on 30 November 2019.

Filmography

Film

Television

References

External links

1985 births
Living people
21st-century English male actors
Alumni of the Guildhall School of Music and Drama
British people of Irish descent
Cusack family (Ireland)
English male film actors
English male models
English male television actors
Irish male film actors
Irish male models
Irish male television actors
Irish people of British descent
Max Irons
People educated at Bryanston School
People educated at The Dragon School
People from the London Borough of Camden
English expatriates in South Korea
Irish expatriates in South Korea
Actors with dyslexia